Association Sportive Algrange is a French association football team. They are based in Algrange, France and are currently playing in the La Division d'Honneur, Lorraine, the sixth tier in the French football league system.

Algrange reached the 8th round of the 2000–01 Coupe de France, losing on penalties to Levallois SC.

References

External links
 AS Algrange Official website 

Association football clubs established in 2000
2000 establishments in France
AS Algrange
Sport in Moselle (department)
Football clubs in Grand Est